The Best of Celine Dion is the third French-language compilation album by Canadian singer Celine Dion, released by Carrere Records in selected European countries on 2 May 1988, preceded by the Eurovision-winning song, "Ne partez pas sans moi". In Germany, the album was issued with a different cover and was titled Vivre.

Background
On 30 April 1988, Dion won the Eurovision Song Contest in Dublin, Ireland. She represented Switzerland with the song "Ne partez pas sans moi". After this success, the single was released in selected European countries on 2 May 1988 and Dion promoted it in mid-May in Switzerland, France, Denmark, Germany, Finland and Italy. The single entered the European charts reaching number one in Belgium, number eleven in Switzerland, number thirty-six in France and number forty-two in the Netherlands. Then Carrere Records / Mega Records issued a compilation of Dion's songs, including "Ne partez pas sans moi". The album titled The Best of Celine Dion was released in Switzerland, France, Belgium, Netherlands and Luxembourg on 2 May 1988. In Germany it was re-titled to Vivre and issued with a different cover but the same track listing.

Content
The Best of Celine Dion starts with the 1988 Eurovision-winning song, "Ne partez pas sans moi". The other songs were previously released in France on Du soleil au cœur (1983) and Les oiseaux du bonheur (1984) or on the singles only: "C'est pour vivre" (1985), "Billy" (1986), "Je ne veux pas" (1987) and "La religieuse" (1988). Aside from "Ne partez pas sans moi", the album also contains another hit-song, "D'amour ou d'amitié" which reached top ten in France in 1983 and was certified Gold by the SNEP for selling over 700,000 copies. All older songs (1982–1986) were produced by Eddy Marnay and Rudi Pascal. The newer tracks (1987–1988) were produced by Romano Musumarra, Didier Barbelivien, Urs Peter Keller and Atilla Şereftuğ.

Track listing

Release history

References

External links
 
 

1988 greatest hits albums
Albums produced by Eddy Marnay
Celine Dion compilation albums